Admiralty Peak is a peak,  high, lying east of Wilckens Peaks in the central part of South Georgia. Charted by Discovery Investigations in 1926–30 and named after the Board of Admiralty.

Mountains and hills of South Georgia